The Falls of Clyde is the collective name of four linn (Scots: waterfalls) on the River Clyde near New Lanark, South Lanarkshire, Scotland. The Falls of Clyde comprise the upper falls of Bonnington Linn, Corra Linn, Dundaff Linn, and the lower falls of Stonebyres Linn. Bonnington Linn (fall of ), Corra Linn and Dundaff Linn (fall of ) are above New Lanark and located within the Falls of Clyde Reserve managed by the Scottish Wildlife Trust, a national nature conservation charity. Stonebyres Linn is located several miles downstream from the reserve and New Lanark.

History 
The area has long been a popular destination for visitors.  The Wordsworths, Coleridge and Sir Walter Scott all visited the Falls. In 1802, William Wordsworth immortalised Corra Linn, the largest of the waterfalls, in verse.  Corra Linn has also been painted by a number of artists, including J. M. W. Turner. The name comes from the Gaelic 'currach', a marshy place. A legend gives 'Cora' as a daughter of King Malcolm II, who leapt to her death here whilst trying to escape imagined danger.

Near Corra Linn is the Pavilion, built by Sir John Carmichael of Bonnington, probably in 1708. The Pavilion had mirrors on its back wall, and when the doors were opened visitors had the illusion of standing beneath the falls. The 15th-century Corra Castle is next to Corra Linn. It is now home to a good number of Daubenton's bat and of some Natterer's and whiskered bats. Corra is Gaelic for "weir", and as Corra Castle's early history is vague, some historians believe it was an early possession of the Weirs, the principal landowning family in the county after the dukes of Hamilton from the 13th to 19th centuries. Corehouse, built in 1844, the home of the Cranstoun family, is nearby. At Stonebyres Linn the ruins of 15th-century Stonebyres Castle may be seen.

Falls of Clyde Site of Special Scientific Interest 

The Falls of Clyde Site of Special Scientific Interest (formerly the Corehouse Nature Reserve), a part of the Clyde Valley Woodlands National Nature Reserve, is an area of mixed woodland, including semi-natural native oakwoods and some areas of conifer plantation.  It provides suitable habitat for badgers, roe deer, and over 100 species of bird.  The site is well known for its resident breeding pair of peregrine falcons, which are protected during the breeding season by Operation Peregrine, providing security for the birds and a chance for the public to view the birds through scopes and CCTV. On 22 October 2011 at 1500 GMT a very rare pine marten was spotted within the reserve and was photographed. Within the reserve the Clyde River is suitable habitat for otters and kingfishers as well as the protected brook lamprey.

The Falls of Clyde Visitor Centre, operated by the Scottish Wildlife Trust, features exhibits about the waterfalls, the woodland and the area animals, including a special bat display.

Hydro-electric power 

The Lanark Hydro Electric Scheme is situated between Corra Linn and Dundaff Linn, with a water inlet at Bonnington Linn, and is considered the oldest of the United Kingdom.

The scheme was conceived in 1925 under the chairmanship of Sir Edward MacColl and was completed in 1927 as the first hydro-electric power station in Scotland. The power station at Stonebyres was designed by Sir Robert Lorimer (who also acted as design advisor to the committee looking at the overall concept).

The plant generates approximately eleven megawatts of power. Another hydro-electric power station is situated near Stonebyres Linn, about three miles south of Corra Linn. This generates approximately six megawatts of power. Both stations are owned and operated by Scottish Power.

Clyde Walkway 

The Clyde walkway long-distance path passes all four falls and ends at Bonnington Linn.

See also
Lanark
Bonnington pavilion, Falls of Clyde
 Falls of Clyde, the last surviving iron-hulled, four-masted full-rigged ship

Maps 

Annotated map of Lanark, New Lanark and Falls of Clyde

References 

Historical Tours in the Clyde Valley. Published by the Clyde Valley Tourist Association and the Lanark & District Archaeological Association. Printed by Robert MacLehose and Company Limited, Renfrew, Scotland. 1982.

External links

 Falls of Clyde Wildlife Reserve
 Visitor Center
 Lanark Hydro-electric Scheme
 

River Clyde
Clyde
Clyde Valley Woodlands National Nature Reserve
Sites of Special Scientific Interest in Clydesdale and South East Glasgow
Inventory of Gardens and Designed Landscapes
Nature centres in Scotland